is an 2019 Japanese film directed by Yoji Yamada. It is the fiftieth entry in the popular and long-running Otoko wa Tsurai yo series. Shooting began on October 20, 2018 and the film was released on December 27, 2019.  

It stars Kiyoshi Atsumi as Torajirō Kuruma (Tora-san). Atsumi died in 1996 and he appears throughout the film as flashbacks, using footage from his dozens of performances as Tora-san in the previous films. It also stars Chieko Baisho, Gin Maeda, Hidetaka Yoshioka, Kumiko Goto, Mari Natsuki, and Ruriko Asaoka, all recreating their roles from the long running film series.

Cast
 Kiyoshi Atsumi as Torajirō Kuruma, otherwise known as Tora-san
 Chieko Baisho as Sakura Suwa
 Ruriko Asaoka as Lily
 Hidetaka Yoshioka as Mitsuo Suwa
 Kumiko Goto as Izumi Bruna
 Gin Maeda as Hiroshi Suwa
 Mari Natsuki as Ayako Hara
 Chizuru Ikewaki as Setsuko Takano 
 Hiyori Sakurada as Yuri Suwa, Mitsuo's daughter
 Isao Hashizume as Kazuo Oikawa
 Nenji Kobayashi as Kubota, Mitsuo's Father in Law
 Tatekawa Shiraku as Rakugo artist
 Takashi Sasano as Gozen-sama
 Jun Miho as Akemi
 Mari Hamada
 Tetsurō Degawa
 Cunning Takeyama
 Gajirō Satō
 Masayasu Kitayama
 Hayashiya Tamahei
 Taiki Matsuno
 Miu Tomita
 Sara Kurashima
 Sōtarō Tanaka
 Keisuke Kuwata

Bibliography

Japanese

References

External links
 Otoko Wa Tsurai Yo 50th Anniversary Project:Official site with all the information about the 50th anniversary of the It's Tough Being a Man Series, including info on this film
 おかえり、寅さん（仮題） eiga.com information page

2019 films
Films directed by Yoji Yamada
2019 comedy films
2010s Japanese-language films
Otoko wa Tsurai yo films
Japanese sequel films
Shochiku films
Films with screenplays by Yôji Yamada
2010s Japanese films